The 1983 Edgbaston Cup was a women's tennis tournament played on outdoor grass courts that was part of the 1983 Virginia Slims World Championship Series. It was the 2nd edition of the tournament. It took place at the Edgbaston Priory Club in Birmingham, United Kingdom, from 6 to 12 June 1983.

Entrants

Seeds

Other entrants
The following players received entry from the qualifying draw:
  Cathy Drury
  Ann Henricksson
  Barbara Jordan
  Anne Minter
  Chris O'Neil
  Brenda Remilton
  Julie Salmon
  Elizabeth Sayers

The following players received a lucky loser spot:
  Etsuko Inoue
  Kim Sands

Finals

Singles

 Billie Jean King defeated  Alycia Moulton 6–0, 7–5
 It was King's second title of the year and the 129th of her career.

Doubles

 Billie Jean King /  Sharon Walsh defeated  Beverly Mould /  Elizabeth Sayers 6–2, 6–4
It was Walsh's 4th doubles title of the year and the 15th of her career.

External links
 1983 Edgbaston Cup draws
 ITF tournament page

Edgbaston Cup
Birmingham Classic (tennis)
Edgbaston Cup
Edgbaston Cup